The 52nd Artillery Regiment "Torino" is an artillery regiment of the Italian Army trained for divisional artillery support. The regiment was based from 1995 to 2016 in Vercelli in Piedmont and moved in 2016 to Bracciano in Lazio. Since September 2020 the regiment is based together with the 8th Field Artillery Regiment "Pasubio" in Persano in Campania. The regiment is administratively assigned to the army's Artillery Command.

Current Structure
As of 2022 the 52nd Artillery Regiment "Torino" consists of:

  Regimental Command, in Persano
 Command and Logistic Support Battery "Pièmont"
 Surveillance, Target Acquisition and Tactical Liaison Battery "Vercelli"
 1st Self-propelled Group "M.O. Nicola Russo"
 1st Howitzer Battery "Piave"
 2nd Howitzer Battery "Arbusow"
 3rd Howitzer Battery "Tscherkow"
 Fire and Technical Support Battery "Divisione Torino"

The Command and Logistic Support Battery fields the following sections: C3 Section, Transport and Materiel Section, Medical Section, and Commissariat Section. The regiment is equipped with PzH 2000 self-propelled howitzers. The Surveillance, Target Acquisition and Tactical Liaison Battery is equipped with RQ-11B Raven unmanned aerial vehicles and ARTHUR counter-battery radars.

External links
Italian Army Website: 52° Reggimento Artiglieria "Torino"

References

Artillery Regiments of Italy
1916 establishments in Italy